Villeneuve-les-Corbières is a commune in the Aude department in southern France.

Geography
It is on the scenic road D611, between Durban-Corbières and Tuchan, in the hills of the Corbières Massif.

Population

Wines of Villeneuve-les-Corbières
Cave Pilote Gerard Ploy
Château l'Espigne
Chateau Lahore-Bergez Earl
Domaine Lerys

See also
 Fitou AOC
 Corbières AOC
 Communes of the Aude department

References

External links

 The World in Focus A website owned by a local resident with photos and videos.
 Official site

Communes of Aude
Aude communes articles needing translation from French Wikipedia